Emmanuel Kweku Owusu Darlington (born 17 July 1996), popularly known as Kweku Darlington, is a Ghanaian musician, songwriter and producer from Kumasi. He became popular with the hit song 'Sika Aba Fie'. He released a remix of the song which featured Fameye, Kuami Eugene, Yaw Tog and Kweku Flick.

Career 
Darlington began writing and recording music at the age of 14. In 2019, he entered the TV3 Mentor Reloaded reality show edition. He made it into the boot camp. He was however evicted during the first eviction show on 12 January 2020. After leaving the show, he released several singles in 2020 including; PEACE (say no to xenophobia), Here We Go, Owuo, Promise, Obaa ne Barima and Nyansa. Obaa ne Barima was the most successful amongst those singles based on radio airtime play and video streams. On 21 March 2021, he released Sika Aba Fie which featured Yaw Tog and Kweku Flick. The song became one of the hit songs in the 2021 year. It was on the Ghana's radio top charts for several weeks. This brought more attention to his talent and songs with the media referring to him as one of the breakout stars of 2021. On 14 May 2021, he released a remix of "Sika Aba Fie", featuring Fameye, Kuami Eugene, Yaw Tog and Kweku Flick.

In February 2022, Darlington was nominated in six award categories for the 2022 3Music Awards with Sika Aba Fie earning three of them for Best Collaboration of the Year, Hip Hop Song of the Year and Song of the Year. He was also nominated for the Breakthrough Act of the Year and Hiplife/Hip Hop Act of the Year.

Discography 

 ONIPA featuring Fameye & Okyeame Kwame
 Baabi Awu
 Aketesia featuring Laycon & Medikal
 Sika Kankan
 Sika Aba Fie Remix featuring Fameye, Kuami Eugene, Yaw Tog & Kweku Flick
 Sika Aba Fie featuring Yaw Tog & Kweku Flick
 Obaa ne Barima
 Nyansa
 Defender
 Promise
 Owuo
 Here We Go

Videography 
Below are some selected videos as shown on his YouTube channel here:

 ONIPA featuring Fameye & Okyeame Kwame
 Baabi Awu
 Aketesia featuring Laycon & Medikal
 Sika Kankan
 Sika Aba Fie Remix featuring Fameye, Kuami Eugene, Yaw Tog & Kweku Flick
 Sika Aba Fie featuring Yaw Tog & Kweku Flick
 Obaa ne Barima
 Nyansa
 Promise
 Owuo
 Here We Go

Awards and nominations

References 

Ghanaian musicians
Ghanaian songwriters
1996 births
Living people